Jasper Napoleon Tincher (November 2, 1878 – November 6, 1951) was a U.S. Representative from Kansas.

Born near Browning, Missouri, Tincher moved with his parents to Medicine Lodge, Kansas, in 1892.
He attended the common and high schools.
He taught school in Hardtner, Kansas, from 1896 until February 1899.
He worked and studied in a law office and was admitted to the bar in May 1899.
He commenced the practice of law in Medicine Lodge, Kansas.
He was also interested in farming and stock raising.

Tincher was elected as a Republican to the Sixty-sixth and to the three succeeding Congresses (March 4, 1919 – March 3, 1927).
He was not a candidate for renomination in 1926.
He moved to Hutchinson, Kansas, in 1926 and practiced law until his death there on November 6, 1951.
He was interred in Memorial Park Cemetery.

References

External links
 

1878 births
1951 deaths
Tincher family
People from Browning, Missouri
People from Medicine Lodge, Kansas
Politicians from Hutchinson, Kansas
Republican Party members of the United States House of Representatives from Kansas